Santa Mesa is a district in Manila, Philippines. It is surrounded by the Pasig River on the southwestern side, and by the San Juan River on its southern and eastern side. Land borders include the districts of San Miguel to the west and Sampaloc to the north; and to the northeast is Quezon City.

Santa Mesa was formerly a part of the Sampaloc district, from which it was partitioned and separated after it had its own parish in 1911. The parish is now known as Old Sta. Mesa (Poblacion), which extends from Victorino Mapa Street to Magsaysay Boulevard. (formerly known as Santa Mesa Boulevard and Calle Santa Mesa)

Etymology
The district's name comes from the Jesuits, who christened the area Hermandad de Santa Mesa de la Misericordia ("Brotherhood of the Holy Table of Mercy"). The local parish church had for its titular Sacred Heart of Jesus, which formed part of the phrase the "Center of the Table is the Sacred Heart which all Graces and Mercy flowed down." The Tuason family are the landlords of Santa Mesa during the Spanish colonial period offered an obra pía ("pious work"), and provided social services to the people Doña Albina Tuason also donated the Land where the Church is located even right at this modern days.

A more popular folk etymology is that the name is a corruption of the Spanish term Santa Misa ("Holy Mass").

History 

Santa Mesa was situated in the alluvial deposits at the confluence of Pasig and San Juan Rivers. It was owned by a Jesuits religious order during the Spanish Era, and it is in this period that Santa Mesa got its name. Santa Mesa is better known for its role in the Philippine–American War, in which the area became a battlefield during the Philippine–American War. The conflict started when Pvt. William W. Grayson shot a Filipino soldier in San Juan Bridge between Santa Mesa and San Juan. In late 2003, the National Historical Commission of the Philippines had determined that the conflict did not happen on San Juan Bridge, but at the juncture of Sociego and Silencio Streets.

Up until the early American period, Santa Mesa was just one of the barrios that comprised Sampaloc, which was a town of the defunct province of Manila before it was absorbed by the city of Manila upon its chartering in 1901. In 1911, Santa Mesa became a separate religious district out of Sampaloc when the first and oldest parish in the Philippines in honor of its Titular Patron, the Sacred Heart of Jesus, was established. The created parish is now known as the Old Santa Mesa, which extended from V. Mapa to Santa Mesa Boulevard. The neighborhood was composed of wealthy and aristocrats Spanish and Filipino families who built summer houses, examples of which are the Sociego Mansion, formerly home of the Tuason Family, and the Carriedo Mansion (currently known as the Antique House in Pureza), formerly home of Governor General Francisco Carriedo y Peredo who spearheaded the clean water system of the City of Manila. Affluent families where attracted to Santa Mesa's cooler climate and the picturesque streets that were lined with ylang-ylang trees along Santa Mesa Boulevard. The abundance of these trees started a perfume industry in Santa Mesa — flowers were harvested, pressed and the oil were exported in great quantities to perfumeries in France.

The small community became the location of the hospital to treat the wounded during World War II. The town experienced its growth after the war.  Santa Mesa was the site of a 1950s suburban development because of its proximity to Central Manila. The Santa Mesa Market was constructed around this period. It was a big shopping complex, and became popular for the selling of Post eXchange or PX Goods from U.S. bases in the Philippines that's why it was called Stop & Shop.

When the Congressional Districts of Manila were created, Sta. Mesa was separated from Sampaloc, falling to the jurisdiction of the 6th District. The national census still considers Santa Mesa as a part of Sampaloc for statistical purposes.

Geography 

Santa Mesa is located in the eastern section of the City of Manila. It is bounded to the west by Lacson Avenue separating it from San Miguel; by Ramon Magsaysay Boulevard to the north bordering it from Sampaloc. The northeast boundary of Santa Mesa is west of SM City Sta. Mesa shopping mall. Although the mall has "Santa Mesa" on its name, it is located in Quezon City very near the city limits of Manila.

The southwestern side of Santa Mesa is along the Pasig River while the southern and eastern sides are along the San Juan River.  Across the San Juan River are the cities of San Juan to the east and a small portion of Mandaluyong to the southeast. Across the Pasig River, are the Manila areas of Santa Ana to the south and Pandacan to the southeast.

The topography of the area is relatively flat as some of the natural variations in elevations have been evened out due to urbanization.

Sites of interest 

 Bacood
 Banda Kawayan Pilipinas (Bamboo Band Philippines)
 United Church of Christ in the Philippines (UCCP - Bacood)
 Philippine Independent Church Bacood (Good Shepherd Parish)
Mabini Shrine (Manila), former home of Apolinario Mabini, Philippines Revolution hero, located inside PUP.
 Our Lady of Lourdes Hospital
 Polytechnic University of the Philippines
 Recurso de Madriaga Pescado
 Sacred Heart of Jesus Catholic School
 Carriedo Mansion ( former home of the Governor General Don Francisco Carriedo y' Peredo who made the water system project of Manila)

Churches

Parks and plazas

Barangays 

Santa Mesa is made up of 51 Barangays. For statistical convenience for housing and population, the data for Santa Mesa is included in the data of Sampaloc.

Zone 58: Barangays 587, 587-A, 588, 589, 590, 591, 592, and 593

Zone 59: Barangays 594, 595, 596, 597, 598, 599, 600, and 601.

Zone 60: Barangays 602, 603, 604, 605, 606, 610, 611, 612, and 613.

Zone 61: Barangays 607, 608, 609, 614, 615, 616, 617, and 618.

Zone 62: Barangays 619, 620, 621, 622, 623, 624, and 625.

Zone 63: Barangays 626, 627, 628, 629, and 630.

Zone 64: Barangays 631, 632, 633, 634, 635, and 636.

References

External links 

 City of Manila – Official website
 

 
Districts of Manila